Engeltjes (English: Angels) is the twelfth studio album by the Belgian-Dutch girlgroup K3. The album was released on 23 November 2012 through label Studio 100. Three singles were released to promote the album: "Waar zijn die engeltjes", "Zeg eens AAA" and "Parapluutje". Engeltjes reached the peak position in the Dutch album charts.

Track list

Personnel
Credits for Engeltjes adapted from fan site.

 Tracy Atkins – text, music
 Allard Buwalda – saxophone
 Karen Damen – vocals
 Peter Gillis – text, music, production
 Serge Hertoge – guitars
 Josje Huisman – vocals
 Jel Jongen – trombone
 Serge Plume – trumpet
 Uwe Teichtert – mastering
 Pallieter Van Buggenhout – guitars
 Alain Vande Putte – text, music
 Kristel Verbeke – vocals
 Ronny Verbiest – accordion
 Miguel Wiels – text, music, keyboards, production

Chart performance

Weekly charts

Year-end charts

Certifications

References

2012 albums
K3 (band) albums